The 2009 Qatar motorcycle Grand Prix was the opening round of the 2009 MotoGP championship. It had originally been due to place on the weekend of 10–12 April 2009 at the Losail International Circuit located in Doha, Qatar. However, the meeting was extended to 13 April, as the MotoGP race was postponed to this date, due to adverse weather conditions on 12 April. The problems were compounded by the event being held at night under floodlights for the benefit of European TV viewers.

This was the last MotoGP round in which a tobacco brand name (Marlboro) was visible on a bike.

Report 
The whole Grand Prix was disrupted by a rare event of rain in Doha, coupled with the impossibility of racing in the wet under floodlights. The 125cc race started at the scheduled time, despite rain being forecast sometime during the race. During the third lap rain began to fall, and the race was finally called after the fourth lap. Shortly after, it was decided to consider the race finished, so Andrea Iannone, who was leading at the time the red flag was exposed, was declared the winner and half points were given, since they failed to complete two thirds of the full race distance (18 laps). This was lucky for Julián Simón as he had crashed after the red flag was shown, and manage to recover back to the track, and was thus classified in second.

After this, talk began to decide whether to race the other two classes or not, since racing with rain in the night could pose a serious threat to riders' safety due to the glare off the track. The organizers, together with safety representative Franco Uncini and riders including Valentino Rossi and Loris Capirossi, made several reconnaissance journeys around the track, which was drying after rain stopped to fall. It was ultimately decided to start the 250cc race, 40 minutes after it was originally scheduled to run. The original race distance of 20 laps was reduced to 13 laps, allowing full points to be awarded while not causing a delay to the MotoGP race. The race went on without problems, and Héctor Barberá won the race ahead of a surprising Jules Cluzel. A frantic multi-bike battle for third place ultimately saw Mike Di Meglio finish third after overtaking teammate Álvaro Bautista and Raffaele De Rosa on the final lap; Hiroshi Aoyama also passed those riders to take 4th place.

MotoGP was kept in its original timeslot. However, shortly before the formation lap, rain began to fall again, and the intensity this time was much higher than the previous. The organisers decided to cancel the event, since the track was too damp to race. After negotiations, it was decided to move the race to the following day, in hope of better weather conditions. The start time was also moved to 21:00 local time, having originally been 23:00.

The Monday race started without problems. The victory went to Casey Stoner, who made a good start from pole and then led the entire race, pulling a comfortable gap over his opponents.
Valentino Rossi finished second; he tried to catch the Australian, coming as near as two seconds from him, but ultimately he had to settle for second, his Yamaha suffering with tyre problems. Third was Jorge Lorenzo, coming a distant 16 seconds from Stoner.

MotoGP classification

250 cc classification

125 cc classification

Championship standings after the race (MotoGP)

Below are the standings for the top five riders and constructors after round one has concluded. 

Riders' Championship standings

Constructors' Championship standings

 Note: Only the top five positions are included for both sets of standings.

References

Qatar motorcycle Grand Prix
Qatar
Motorcycle Grand Prix